Melbourne United is an Australian professional basketball team based in Melbourne, Victoria. United compete in the National Basketball League (NBL) and play their home games at John Cain Arena.

The team made their debut in the NBL in 1984 as the Melbourne Tigers, as an extension of the Melbourne Basketball Association (MBA). The franchise entered into private ownership in 2002, ending the team's relation with the MBA. The Tigers were led by coach Lindsay Gaze and his son Andrew from 1984 until 2005, with the pair guiding the Tigers to two championships in the 1990s. The pair were supported by fellow club legends such as Dave Simmons, Lanard Copeland and Mark Bradtke. Four consecutive NBL Grand Finals followed between 2006 and 2009, with championships coming in 2006 and 2008 behind the likes of Chris Anstey and Darryl McDonald. After 31 seasons of using the Melbourne Tigers name, the franchise was renamed Melbourne United in May 2014, a controversial change that was met with opposition by Tigers fans, former Tigers players and the wider NBL community. Four years later, the franchise won their first championship since adopting the Melbourne United name. The franchise won their sixth championship in 2021. Their six championships is second only to the Perth Wildcats (10) for most titles in NBL history.

Franchise history

Gaze era (1984–2005)
Melbourne United's history stems back to 1931 with the beginning of basketball in Victoria. The Melbourne Tigers brand came into use in 1975, and after the Tigers won the South Eastern Basketball League (SEBL) title in 1983, a new Melbourne Tigers entity was entered into the National Basketball League (NBL) in 1984, as an extension of the Melbourne Basketball Association (MBA). The Tigers struggled initially, given a lack of financial resources. During the early struggles of the 1980s, the Tigers were led by coach Lindsay Gaze and his son Andrew. Andrew Gaze was a prolific scorer, as he set a still-standing NBL record with 44.1 points per game for the 1987 season. During the year, he had a 60-point game against the Newcastle Falcons. Despite his dominance, the Tigers finished with a 3–23 record. The addition of imports David Colbert and Dave Simmons in 1989 saw the Tigers make their first-ever finals appearance.

The addition of Lanard Copeland in 1992 led to the Tigers reaching their maiden NBL Grand Final series, where they were defeated 2–1 by the South East Melbourne Magic. Gaze and Copeland formed arguably the best back-court partnership in NBL history, with Copeland happily playing second fiddle to Gaze and almost always stepping up as the "go to" man when Gaze was absent. Joining Gaze, Copeland and Simmons in 1993 was Mark Bradtke, as the foursome led the Tigers back to the NBL Grand Final, where they faced the Perth Wildcats. Having split the first two games, Game 3 in Perth went down to the wire. A tense and tight affair led to a frantic final minute – with the Wildcats trailing by three and Andrew Vlahov holding possession, his three-point attempt from the top of the arc looked oh-so-good, before completing a near-full circle of the rim and hitting the backboard before rattling out. It was a fitting maiden championship win for Andrew and Lindsay Gaze, with the father-son duo embracing in a memorable teary breakdown following the game.

The Tigers returned to the NBL Grand Final in 1996, where they were once again beaten 2–1 by the South East Melbourne Magic. Following the 1996 season, the Tigers parted ways with Dave Simmons. The 1997 season began with import Jarvis Lang being released and replaced by Marcus Timmons. Behind Gaze, Copeland, Bradtke and Timmons, the Tigers reached their fourth NBL Grand Final series, as they finished the 1997 season on a 17–1 run that included a record 16-game winning streak. They once again faced the Magic, this time claiming a 2–1 victory to win their second NBL Championship.

The Tigers were unable to recapture their championship form throughout the rest of the 1990s and the early 2000s. In 2002, the franchise entered into private ownership after the organisation had racked up a $2 million debt. Poor management has led losses to mount rapidly in the so-called professional phase of the Melbourne Basketball Association's ownership of the franchise. A new ownership consortium under Melbourne businessman Seamus McPeake and the Gazes saw financial stability restored to the organisation for the 2002–03 season.

New championship era (2005–2009)

The Gaze era ended in 2005 with the retirement of coach Lindsay and the sport's greatest Australian player, Andrew. In addition, the Tigers parted ways with both Mark Bradtke and Lanard Copeland. Darryl McDonald and imports Rashad Tucker and Dave Thomas were joined by Chris Anstey for the 2005–06 season. Fellow stalwarts in the team included Daryl Corletto, Stephen Hoare and Tommy Greer. Behind coach Al Westover, the Tigers reached the 2006 NBL Grand Final series, where they swept the Sydney Kings 3–0. 

The 2006–07 season saw the Tigers return to the NBL Grand Final, where they were defeated 3–1 by the Brisbane Bullets. The 2007 off-season saw the Tigers acquire David Barlow and Nathan Crosswell, joining a core of Anstey, McDonald, Thomas, Corletto, Hoare and Greer. Import Sean Lampley joined the Tigers mid-season and helped them reach their third straight NBL Grand Final, where they once again faced the Sydney Kings. The series was tied at 2–2 heading into the deciding Game 5. Game 5 saw the Tigers complete the job they were so close to doing in Game 4 at home by winning 85–73 at the Kingdome to celebrate Darryl McDonald's last game in style. Both Anstey and Thomas finished with 21 points and 12 rebounds. In 2008, the Tigers acquired the services of Sam Mackinnon and Ebi Ere, while long-time swingman Dave Thomas departed for Cairns. However, following an injury to Mackinnon and the mid-season departure of Rod Grizzard, Thomas and Luke Kendall were acquired in January 2009. The 2008–09 season saw the Tigers return to the NBL Grand Final for a fourth straight year, but they were defeated 3–2 by the South Dragons.

End of Tigers era (2009–2014)

In May 2009, the Tigers made a short-lived decision to sit out the 2009–10 season, after losing money in 2008–09 for the first time in five years. The franchise felt that NBL reforms had not gone far enough to make it feasible to play. They ultimately continued on in the now eight-team competition in 2009–10.

Sam Mackinnon continued on with the Tigers in 2009, while Mark Worthington was acquired following the demise of the South Dragons. Star imports Ebi Ere and Dave Thomas parted ways with Melbourne after the franchise decided to go with an 'all-Australian' roster. The policy was short-lived as Julius Hodge joined the Tigers in November, while Mike Rose joined the squad in January.

In the off-season of 2010, the Tigers roster was dismantled after the departure of Hodge, Worthington and Nathan Crosswell, as well as the retirements of NBL greats Mackinnon and Anstey. The team picked up imports TJ Campbell and Eric Devendorf, as well as Australians Cameron Tragardh, Matt Burston, Wade Helliwell, Luke Nevill and Lucas Walker. Corletto and Greer continued on with the Tigers, as did Bennie Lewis. 2010 NBL MVP Corey Williams joined the squad in November in place of the outgoing Campbell, while Nevill and Devendorf were let go in February. Club legend Darryl McDonald completed the 2010–11 season as coach of the Tigers following the sacking of Al Westover.

In the off-season of 2011, the Tigers acquired the services of coach Trevor Gleeson, and recruited Ayinde Ubaka, Ron Dorsey and Daniel Dillon from Cairns. They also acquired Liam Rush to go along with the addition of Patty Mills for the duration of the 2011 NBA lockout. In January 2012, following a 13-point loss to the Gold Coast Blaze, owner Seamus McPeake made a post-game address to the playing group and then sacked Ubaka on the spot, while Gleeson was at a press conference.

In 2012, the Tigers acquired Chris Goulding, Nate Tomlinson, Adam Ballinger, and imports Seth Scott and Kevin Braswell. Burston, Walker, Rush, Lewis and Greer continued on, while club legend Chris Anstey became head coach. In November of the 2012–13 season, Jonny Flynn replaced Braswell, but the Tigers missed the post-season for the fourth straight year.

The 2013–14 season saw the return of Mark Worthington to the Tigers, while Goulding, Tomlinson, Ballinger, Walker and Greer all continued on under Anstey. Ayinde Ubaka had a short-lived stint with the Tigers to begin the season, before Mustapha Farrakhan Jr. replaced him in November to team up alongside fellow import Scott Morrison. Goulding was key to the Tigers reaching the finals for the first time since 2009, where they lost to the Adelaide 36ers in the semis.

Melbourne United (2014–present)

On 20 May 2014, the franchise was re-branded as Melbourne United. The change was made to symbolise the connection to all of Victorian basketball, with the navy blue logo of Melbourne United becoming the new face of professional basketball in Victoria, replacing the Melbourne Tigers brand. Owner Larry Kestelman wanted to end the partisan divisions between the Tigers (Melbourne Basketball Association) and other Victorian supporters and bring the state together behind one NBL team. The change was met with strong scrutiny from members, fans and past legends such as Andrew Gaze and Lanard Copeland, with the latter even stating he wanted his jersey "taken down from the rafters".

Tigers legend Daryl Corletto returned to the franchise in 2014 after three years with the New Zealand Breakers, while David Barlow returned after five years in Europe following the retirement of Tommy Greer. Mark Worthington, Lucas Walker and Nate Tomlinson continued on from the Tigers to United, while Daniel Kickert joined the squad alongside imports Jordan McRae and Stephen Dennis. Following an 89–61 loss to the Cairns Taipans in the 2014–15 season opener, coach Chris Anstey resigned and was replaced by his assistant Darryl McDonald in the interim. United went on to finish their inaugural season in fifth place with a 13–15 record. 

In 2015, United hired Dean Demopoulos as coach and acquired swingman Todd Blanchfield. The franchise also welcomed back Chris Goulding after he spent the 2014–15 season in Spain. With Kickert and Tomlinson continuing on, United recruited Majok Majok alongside imports Hakim Warrick and Stephen Holt. Brad Hill was signed as an injury-replacement for Barlow prior to the season after Barlow suffered a season-ending Achilles injury. Melbourne went on to claim the minor premiership in 2015–16 with a first-place finish and an 18–10 record, before losing to the fourth-seeded New Zealand Breakers in the semi-finals.

In 2016, Goulding, Blanchfield, Majok and Tomlinson were joined by new recruits Tai Wesley and David Andersen. Barlow also returned to the line-up after recovering from the Achilles injury. United started the 2016–17 season with imports Cedric Jackson, Devin Williams and Ramone Moore, but ultimately replaced all three mid-season with Casper Ware, Josh Boone and Lasan Kromah respectively. While Kromah failed to make an impact, Ware and Boone led Melbourne to a late-season finals charge, only to miss out by two games.

The 2017 off-season saw the departure of Dean Demopoulos and the hiring of Dean Vickerman as head coach. Under Demopoulos, United underachieved due to a one-dimensional game plan and a lack of direction at the defensive end. With Vickerman came a cultural shift based around sharing the wealth offensively and leading from within. With a returning cast of Goulding, Ware, Boone, Wesley, Andersen, Barlow and Majok, United acquired the services of Casey Prather, a swingman coming off back-to-back championships with the Perth Wildcats. United also signed former one-time Melbourne Tiger Daniel Dillon, but an Achilles injury to Dillon forced the team to sign Peter Hooley in his place. United were title favourites at the start of the 2017–18 season, but fell to a 2–3 record following a loss to the Brisbane Bullets in Round 4. In December, Prather went down with a possible season-ending elbow injury and was replaced by Carrick Felix. With defensive-minded Felix in the line-up, United went 9–1. Felix was removed from Melbourne's active roster in mid-February following Prather's return from injury. United finished the regular season as minor premiers for the second time in three years, earning a 20–8 record. They went on to sweep the Breakers in the semi-finals to reach the 2018 NBL Grand Final series. There they faced the Adelaide 36ers. With the series tied at 2–2 heading into the deciding Game 5, Ware and Goulding each scored 23 points with Prather adding 19 points, 11 rebounds and five steals to lead United to a 100–82 win, as the franchise claimed their first NBL Championship under the new moniker. Goulding was named grand final MVP.

In the 2018–19 NBL season, United returned to the NBL Grand Final series, where they lost 3–1 to the Perth Wildcats.

In the 2020–21 NBL season, United were crowned minor premiers with a 28–8 record behind the likes of Goulding, Jock Landale, Scotty Hopson and Mitch McCarron. They reached their third grand final in four years with a 2–1 semi-final series win over their crosstown rivals the South East Melbourne Phoenix. They went on to sweep the Perth Wildcats in the grand final series 3–0 to win their second championship as United and sixth as a franchise. Landale was named grand final MVP.

In the 2021–22 NBL season, United were crowned minor premiers for the second year in a row.

Home arena
The Melbourne Tigers played out of their traditional home, the 2,000 seat Albert Park Basketball Stadium from 1984–1987 before moving into the 7,200-capacity Melbourne Sports and Entertainment Centre (more commonly known as The Glass House) in 1988. The Tigers played in The Glass House (which it shared with the North Melbourne Giants) from 1987–1991 before they and new team South East Melbourne Magic both moved into the 14,820-seat National Tennis Centre in 1992. The centre could hold up to 15,400 for basketball (almost 2,000 more than the Brisbane Entertainment Centre which at 13,500 had been the largest venue since 1986), easily making it the largest venue in the NBL at the time. The Tigers enjoyed success at the Tennis Centre, winning the NBL championship in 1993 and again in 1997 as well as making the Grand Final in 1992 and 1996. In 1996, the Tigers and Magic set a then NBL record attendance of 15,366 for a regular season game at the Tennis Centre, while the 1996 Grand Final series between the two Melbourne rivals set an NBL record aggregate attendance of 43,605 over the 3-game series, a record that still stands as of the 2016–17 NBL season.

Citing the rising costs of playing games at the Tennis Centre, the Tigers moved to the newly built, 10,500 capacity Vodafone Arena (now John Cain Arena) in 2000. Located next door to the Tennis Centre, the Tigers remained at Vodafone until 2002 before they moved again into the smaller (3,500 seat) State Netball and Hockey Centre.

Since 2012, the club has split its games between John Cain Arena and the Netball Centre, but in 2015 also played games at the newly renovated Margaret Court Arena which (as part of the Melbourne Park tennis complex) had been given a retractable-roof as well as an upgrade from 6,000 to 7,500 seats. From 2016–17, Melbourne United will play most of its games at John Cain Arena with a select number of games played at the Netball Centre during January due to the Australian Open tennis (John Cain Arena is the second largest arena at Melbourne Park).

Melbourne's all-time home game attendance record was set on 11 July 1994 when 15,129 attended a Round 14 game between the Tigers and South East Melbourne at the Tennis Centre. As Melbourne United, the team's record home attendance of 10,300 was set on 4 December 2016 against the New Zealand Breakers at Melbourne Arena during Round 9 of the 2016–17 NBL season.

 Albert Park Basketball Stadium (1984–1987)
 Melbourne Entertainment Centre (1988–1991)
 Rod Laver Arena (1992–2000)
 John Cain Arena (2000–2002, 2012–present)
 State Netball Hockey Centre (2002–2017)
 Margaret Court Arena (2014–2016)

Since 2018, United have trained and had their head offices located at the Melbourne Sports and Aquatic Centre in Albert Park.

Honour roll 

Source: Melbourne United History, Melbourne Tigers History

Season by season

All-time records
As of the end of the 2022–23 season

Summary

Source: Melbourne United Board

Retired jerseys

Current roster

Notable past players

Preseason games against NBA teams

References

External links 

 

 
National Basketball League (Australia) teams
1931 establishments in Australia
Basketball teams established in 1931
Basketball teams in Melbourne
Sport in the City of Melbourne (LGA)